The 2016 Careers for Veterans 200 was the 14th stock car race of the 2016 NASCAR Camping World Truck Series, and the 17th iteration of the event. The race was held on Saturday, August 27, 2016, in Brooklyn, Michigan, at Michigan International Speedway, a 2.0-mile (3.2 km) permanent tri-oval shaped racetrack. The race took the scheduled 100 laps to complete. In an exciting battle for the win, Brett Moffitt, driving for Red Horse Racing, made a three-wide pass for the lead on the final lap, and held off Timothy Peters in the final turn to earn his first career NASCAR Camping World Truck Series win, and a 1-2 finish for Red Horse Racing. To fill out the podium, Daniel Hemric, driving for Brad Keselowski Racing, would finish 3rd, respectively.

Background 

The track is used primarily for NASCAR events. It is sometimes known as a sister track to Texas World Speedway, and was used as the basis of Auto Club Speedway. The track is owned by NASCAR. Michigan International Speedway is recognized as one of motorsports' premier facilities because of its wide racing surface and high banking (by open-wheel standards; the 18-degree banking is modest by stock car standards).

Entry list 

 (R) denotes rookie driver.
 (i) denotes driver who is ineligible for series driver points.

Practice

First practice 
The first practice session was held on Friday, August 26, at 1:30 pm EST, and last for 1 hour and 25 minutes.

Final practice 
The final practice session was held on Friday, August 26, at 4:00 pm EST, and would last for 55 minutes.

Qualifying 
Qualifying was held on Saturday, August 27, at 9:45 am EST. Since Michigan International Speedway is at least 1.5 miles (2.4 km) in length, the qualifying system was a single car, single lap, two round system where in the first round, everyone would set a time to determine positions 13–32. Then, the fastest 12 qualifiers would move on to the second round to determine positions 1–12.

Full qualifying results

Race results

Standings after the race 

Drivers' Championship standings

Note: Only the first 8 positions are included for the driver standings.

References 

NASCAR races at Michigan International Speedway
August 2016 sports events in the United States
2016 in sports in Michigan